Angat may refer to:

 Angat, Bulacan, a first class partially urban municipality in the province of Bulacan, Philippines
 Angat River, a river in the province of Bulacan, Philippines, flowing from the Sierra Madre mountain range to Manila Bay